Terrell Keith McKeller (born July 9, 1964) is a former American football tight end for the Buffalo Bills from 1987 to 1993.

Before his NFL career, McKeller attended Jacksonville State University on a basketball scholarship.   He was the power forward on the 1984/85 NCAA Men's Division II Basketball Championship team and led the Gulf South Conference in rebounds for three of his four seasons.  He finished his four seasons of college basketball with 1,495 points (4th in school history) and 1,209 rebounds (2nd).  In 1986, he decided to join the school's football team as a walk-on.  Despite not playing football since high school, McKeller immediately made the starting lineup and went on to catch 26 passes for 449 yards and three touchdowns.  In 1987, he was selected by the Bills in the 9th round of the NFL draft.

McKeller's blocking and pass receiving was a big asset to the team during the early 1990s, assisting them to 4 Super Bowl appearances — Super Bowl XXV, Super Bowl XXVI, Super Bowl XXVII, and Super Bowl XXVIII.  His best season was in 1990, when he caught 34 passes for 464 yards and 5 touchdowns.

The Bills K-Gun offense under Marv Levy was actually named after McKeller's nickname "Killer" (not Jim Kelly, contrary to popular belief), who made it possible with his ability to block and pass catch effectively on different plays during the no huddle.

McKeller finished his 7 NFL seasons with 124 receptions for 1,464 yards and 11 touchdowns.

McKeller's son, Darius, is an offensive lineman at the University of South Alabama.

References

1964 births
Living people
Players of American football from Birmingham, Alabama
American football tight ends
Jacksonville State Gamecocks football players
Jacksonville State Gamecocks men's basketball players
Buffalo Bills players
American men's basketball players
Power forwards (basketball)